The ISC High Performance, formerly known as the International Supercomputing Conference, is a yearly conference on supercomputing which has been held in Europe since 1986. It stands as the oldest supercomputing conference in the world.

History
In 1986 Professor Dr. Hans Werner Meuer, director of the computer centre and professor for computer science at the University of Mannheim (Germany) co-founded and organized the "Mannheim Supercomputer Seminar" which had 81 participants. This was held yearly and became the annual International Supercomputing Conference and Exhibition (ISC). In 2015, the name was officially changed to ISC High Performance. The conference is attended by speakers, vendors, and researchers from all over the world. Since 1993 the conference has been the venue for one of the twice yearly TOP500 announcements where the fastest 500 supercomputers in the world are named. The other annual announcement is in November at the SC Conference (The International Conference for High Performance Computing, Networking, Storage and Analysis) in the USA.

The conference celebrated 30 years with the 19 June 2016 meeting in Frankfurt, Germany. Its 33rd edition in 2019 attracted a record number of participants – 164 exhibitors, and 3,573 visitors from 64 countries.

References

External links
  of the ISC High Performance

1986 establishments in Germany
Annual events in Germany
Computer science conferences
Recurring events established in 1986
Supercomputing